Raymond John "Ray" McArthur (c. 1917 - 5 August 1974) was an Australian rules footballer who played with West Adelaide in the SANFL.

McArthur played in many positions during his career including ruckman. He made his debut 1935 and was West Adelaide's best and fairest winner two years later. In 1939 he tied in the voting for the Magarey Medal with Jeff Pash but lost the award after an additional count. He was, however, awarded a retrospective Magarey Medal in 1998.

During World War Two he played with the combined West Adelaide-Glenelg side before resuming with West Adelaide when the war ended. He topped West's goalkicking in 1945 with 42 goals before retiring at the end of the following season, finishing with 152 games. On four occasions during his career he represented South Australia at interstate football.

External links

West Adelaide Football Club players
Magarey Medal winners
1910s births
1974 deaths
Australian rules footballers from South Australia